The SA Tennis Open was a professional men's tennis tournament in South Africa that ran for three years from 2009 to 2011.

The tournament was played on outdoor hard courts, each February at Montecasino in Johannesburg. It started as a Grand Prix tennis circuit event and was part of the ATP World Tour 250.

Results

Singles

Doubles

See also
South African Open

References

External links
SA Tennis Open official website
South Africa Tennis Association (SATA) official website

 
Hard court tennis tournaments
Tennis tournaments in South Africa
Sports competitions in Johannesburg
Defunct tennis tournaments in Africa
Recurring sporting events established in 2009
Recurring sporting events disestablished in 2011
2009 establishments in South Africa
2011 disestablishments in South Africa
Defunct sports competitions in South Africa